In microeconomics, a consumer's Hicksian demand function  or compensated demand function for a good is his quantity demanded  as part of the solution to minimizing his expenditure on all goods while delivering a fixed level of utility.   Essentially, a Hicksian demand function shows how an economic agent would react to the change in the price of a good, if the agent's income was compensated to guarantee the agent the same utility previous to the change in the price of the good—the agent will remain on the same indifference curve before and after the change in the price of the good. The function is named after John Hicks.

Mathematically,

.

where h(p,u) is the Hicksian demand function, or commodity bundle demanded, at price vector p and utility level . Here p is a vector of prices, and x is a vector of quantities demanded, so   the sum of all pixi  is   total expenditure on all goods. (Note that if there is more than one vector of quantities that minimizes expenditure for the given utility, we have a Hicksian demand correspondence  rather than a function.)

Hicksian demand functions are useful for isolating the effect of relative prices on quantities demanded of goods, in contrast to Marshallian demand functions, which combine that with the effect of the real income of the consumer being reduced by a price increase, as explained below.

Relationship to other functions
Hicksian demand functions are often convenient for mathematical manipulation because they do not require income or wealth to be represented. However, Marshallian demand functions of the form  that describe demand given prices p and income  are easier to observe directly. The two are related by

where  is the expenditure function (the function that gives the minimum wealth required to get to a given utility level), and by

where  is the indirect utility function (which gives the utility level of having a given wealth under a fixed price regime). Their derivatives are more fundamentally related by the Slutsky equation.

Whereas Marshallian demand comes from the Utility Maximization Problem, Hicksian Demand comes from the Expenditure Minimization Problem. The two problems are mathematical duals, and hence the Duality Theorem provides a method of proving the relationships described above.

The Hicksian demand function is intimately related to the expenditure function. If the consumer's utility function  is locally nonsatiated and strictly convex, then
by  Shephard's lemma it is true that

Hicksian demand and compensated price changes
Marshallian demand curves show the effect of price changes on quantity demanded. As the price of a good rises, ordinarily, the quantity of that good demanded will fall, but not in every case. The price rise has both a   substitution effect and an income effect. The substitution effect is the change in quantity demanded due to a price change that alters the slope of the budget constraint but leaves the consumer on the same indifference curve (i.e., at the same level of utility). The substitution effect always is to buy less of that good. The income effect is the change in quantity demanded due to the effect of the price change on the consumer's total buying power. Since for the Marshallian demand function the consumer's nominal income is held constant, when a price rises his real income falls and he is poorer. If the good in question is a normal good and its price rises,   the income effect from the fall in purchasing power   reinforces the substitution effect.  If the good is an inferior good,   the income effect will offset in some degree to the substitution effect.  If the good is  a Giffen good, the income effect is so strong that the Marshallian quantity demanded rises when the price rises.

The Hicksian demand function   isolates the substitution effect by supposing the consumer is compensated with  exactly enough extra income after the price rise to purchase some bundle on the same indifference curve.  If the Hicksian demand function is  steeper  than the Marshallian demand, the good is a normal good; otherwise, the good is inferior. Hicksian demand always slopes down.

Mathematical properties
If the consumer's utility function  is continuous and represents a locally nonsatiated preference relation, then the Hicksian demand correspondence  satisfies the following properties:

i. Homogeneity of degree zero in p: For all , . This is because the same x that minimizes  also minimizes  subject to the same constraint.

ii. No excess demand: The constraint  holds with strict equality, . This follows from continuity of the utility function. Informally, they could simply spend less until utility was exactly .

See also
 Marshallian demand function
 Convex preferences
 Expenditure minimization problem
 Slutsky equation
 Duality (optimization)

References

Demand